Eastern Point Light is a historic lighthouse on Cape Ann, in northeastern Massachusetts.It is known as the oldest seaport in America. The harbor has supported fishermen, whalers, and traders since 1616.

History 
The lighthouse was originally planned in 1829 and was erected by 1832 on the east side of the Gloucester Harbor entrance. It was first lit on January 1, 1832. The tower was rebuilt in 1848 and again in 1890. The lighthouse has an attached two-story keeper's quarters, built in 1879.

In 1880, the lighthouse was occupied by American landscape painter Winslow Homer. It was automated by September 1985 and was added to the National Register of Historic Places in 1987.  The lighthouse is currently operated by the United States Coast Guard and is closed to the public.

A distinctive rock formation known as Mother Ann is located along the shore near the lighthouse.

See also
National Register of Historic Places listings in Gloucester, Massachusetts
National Register of Historic Places listings in Essex County, Massachusetts

References

Lighthouses completed in 1832
Lighthouses completed in 1848
Lighthouses completed in 1890
Lighthouses on the National Register of Historic Places in Massachusetts
Lighthouses in Essex County, Massachusetts
Buildings and structures in Gloucester, Massachusetts
National Register of Historic Places in Essex County, Massachusetts
Historic districts on the National Register of Historic Places in Massachusetts